Naiguatá (GC-23) was a  littoral patrol boat of the Venezuelan Coast Guard.  The vessel was constructed by Navantia in Cádiz, Spain beginning in 2008. On 30 March 2020, the vessel rammed the cruise ship  in international waters and sank.

Construction and career
Naiguatá was the third ship of the  BVLs.  BVL stands for "Buque de Vigilancia de Litoral", which is Spanish for littoral surveillance ship.  It had a displacement of 1,720 tons.  It was built by Navantia in Spain at the San Fernando shipyards in Cádiz, based on a standard Navantia Avante 1400 design. The keel was laid in October 2008.  The ship was launched on 24 June 2009, christened by Alma Pura de Padrón and named after the city of Naiguatá.  The Venezuelan Navy took delivery of Naiguatá from the builder and subsequently transferred it to the Venezuelan Coast Guard. Its weapons systems consisted of one Leonardo OTO Melara 76 mm gun, one CIWS anti-aircraft/anti-missile Rheinmetall Oerlikon Millennium Gun, and two 12.7 mm machine guns.

Sinking
Naiguatá sank following its deliberate ramming of the ice class cruise ship  while in international waters on 30 March 2020.  According to RCGS Resolutes owner, the Coast Guard ship had fired shots and ordered the cruise ship to follow it to Margarita Island, a Venezuelan harbour.  Naiguatá sank following the ramming, with RCGS Resolute informing the international Maritime Rescue Coordination Centre (MRCC) of the incident and offering assistance. After staying in the area for an hour, RCGS Resolute was informed through MRCC that assistance was not required as Naiguatás crew had been rescued by the Venezuelan Navy. 

Venezuelan president Nicolás Maduro accused the captain of the cruise ship of "piracy" and "terrorism", adding later that he did not rule out that RCGS Resolute was "carrying mercenaries to attack onshore military bases". The Venezuelan minister of defence said RCGS Resolutes action was an act of "imperial aggression".

References 

 

Patrol vessels of the Bolivarian Navy of Venezuela
2009 ships
Maritime incidents in 2020
Ships sunk in collisions
Shipwrecks in the Caribbean Sea
Crisis in Venezuela
Maritime history of Venezuela